Kenneth or Ken Norris may refer to:
 
 Dick Norris, Kenneth Richard Norris (1914–2003), Australian entomologist
 Kenneth S. Norris (1924–1998), American marine mammal biologist and conservationist
 Ken Norris (athlete) (born 1931), British long-distance runner
 Ken Norris (actor) (died 2008), in The Space Museum
 Ken Norris (poet) (born 1951), poet, editor, and professor of Canadian literature
 Ken Norris (designer), see Ron Ayers
 Kenneth True Norris Jr. (1930-1996), industrialist and philanthropist
 Ken Norris, fictional character, see Kyle Sampson (Guiding Light)